John Matthias  (born 1878) was a Welsh international footballer. He was part of the Wales national football team between 1896 and 1899, playing 5 matches. He played his first match on 29 February 1896 against Ireland and his last match on 18  March 1899 against Scotland.

See also
 List of Wales international footballers (alphabetical)

References

1878 births
Welsh footballers
Wales international footballers
Place of birth missing
Year of death missing
Association football defenders
Wolverhampton Wanderers F.C. players
Shrewsbury Town F.C. players
Brymbo Institute F.C. players